Estonia competed at the 2012 Summer Paralympics in London, United Kingdom from August 29 to September 9, 2012.

Athletics 

Men’s Field Events

Women’s Field Events

Swimming

Men

See also

 Estonia at the 2012 Summer Olympics

References

Nations at the 2012 Summer Paralympics
2012
2012 in Estonian sport